Blinky may refer to:

Characters
 Blinky (comics), a character in the UK comic The Dandy
 Blinky (ghost), a red (sometimes orange) ghost in the Pac-Man franchise
 Blinky (mascot), the mascot of FreeDOS
 Blinky (The Simpsons), three-eyed fish from the animated television sitcom The Simpsons
 Blinky Bill, anthropomorphic koala appearing in Australian books and a television program
 Blinky the Clown, a clown from the television program called Blinky's Fun Club
 Blinky, the villain from Stamp Day for Superman
 Blinky the Dog, a character in the weekly comic strip This Modern World
 Blinky, male koala in Noozles, an anime also known as The Wonderous Koala Blinky
 Blinky, the robotic title character from the film BlinkyTM
 Blinky, the playable character in Titanic Blinky

People
 Blinky (singer) (born 1944), artist on Motown, real name Sondra Williams
 Blinky Elizalde, judoka competitor and coach
 Blinky Palermo (1943–1977), 20th-century German abstract painter

Others
 Blinky (film), a 1923 comedy-western film starring Hoot Gibson
 Blinky (image), an animated image (usually in GIF format)
 Blinky (novelty), a small flashing novelty item
 A police car used by the Toronto Police Service, to promote child safety

See also
 Blinky Blink, American rapper
 Blinkie, a character in The Scarecrow of Oz by L. Frank Baum